The 1965 Chattanooga Moccasins football team was an American football team that represented the University of Chattanooga (now known as the University of Tennessee at Chattanooga) during the 1965 NCAA College Division football season. In their 35th year under head coach Scrappy Moore, the team compiled a 5–4–1 record.

Schedule

References

Chattanooga
Chattanooga Mocs football seasons
Chattanooga Moccasins football